The privileged bodies of the United Kingdom are those institutions and corporations which enjoy the historic right to present an address to the British Sovereign in person.

In modern times this right is exercised on significant occasions in the life of the monarch and at a ceremony specially organised for the purpose.  A senior representative of each body delivers each loyal address and, after each has been read, the monarch responds and receives parchment copies of each.

List 

Most recently the following 27 bodies presented loyal addresses to King Charles III on 9 March 2023 at a ceremony at Buckingham Palace to mark the start of his reign:

The General Synod  of the Church of England
The University of Oxford
The University of Cambridge
The General Assembly of the  Church of Scotland
The Free Churches Group
The Religious Society of Friends (Quakers)
The City of London Corporation
The Corporation of the City of Edinburgh
The University of Edinburgh
The University of London
The University of St Andrews
The University of Glasgow
The University of Aberdeen
The Royal Society
The Greater London Authority
The Royal Academy of Arts
The Board of Deputies of the British Jews and the Anglo-Jewish Association
The Bank of England
The Lieutenancy of the City of London
The Dean and Chapter of Westminster
The Dean and Chapter of St Paul’s Cathedral
The Corporation of the City of Westminster
The Royal Borough of Windsor and Maidenhead
The Dean and Canons of St George’s Chapel, Windsor
The Royal County of Berkshire
The Catholic Church in  England and Wales
The Military Knights of Windsor

History 

The speeches given and presented were originally called humble addresses, like those of Parliament, but over time have become known as loyal addresses. They offered regional government and other organisations an opportunity to demonstrate their dedication to the Crown. There were formerly several hundred privileged bodies and the addresses provided the opportunity to reassert their loyalty as well as drawing the monarch's attention to particular issues. In an age of limited communications, it was a rare and valuable opportunity to directly address the monarch. It also gave the government of the time an idea of what concerned the country’s citizens.

Today, as with Parliament's humble addresses, the privilege is more ceremonial than political, serving to emphasise and reaffirm the antiquity and importance of the privileged bodies on special royal occasions.

Queen Elizabeth II received the privileged bodies five times during her reign:

her accession in 1952 
her Silver Jubilee in 1977 
the engagement of The Prince of Wales in 1981 
her Golden Jubilee in 2002
her Diamond Jubilee in 2012

King Charles III has currently received them once during his reign:

to mark the start of his reign and before his coronation in 2023

References 

British monarchy
State ritual and ceremonies
Ceremonies in the United Kingdom